Washim railway station is a small railway station in Washim district, in Vidharbha region of the Maharashtra. Its code is WHM. It serves Washim city. The station consists of three platforms. The platforms are well sheltered. It lacks many facilities including water and sanitation.

The station lies on Purna–Khandwa section of South Central Railway. It was in Hyderabad railway division of SCR and now is in Nanded railway division after bifurcation of Hyderabad railway division. Washim was connected to the broad-gauge railway network in 2008 when tracks were extended from Purna to Akola.

Trains 

Some of the trains that runs from Washim are:

 Hazur Sahib Nanded–Bikaner Weekly Express
 Hazur Sahib Nanded–Ajmer SpecialFare Special
 Pune–Amravati Express
 Nagpur–Kolhapur CSMT Express (via Hingoli, Latur)
 Indore–Yesvantpur Weekly Express
 Secunderabad–Jaipur Express 
 Kacheguda–Narkher Intercity Express via New Amravati
 Kacheguda–Akola InterCity Express
 Ajmer–Kacheguda SpecialFare Urs Special
 Ajni–Mumbai LTT Express (via Aurangabad)
 Hazur Sahib Nanded–Una Himachal (Weekly) Superfast Express
 Amritsar–Hazur Sahib Nanded Superfast Express
 Hyderabad–Ajmer Superfast Express 
 Tirupati–Amravati Bi Weekly Superfast Express
 Hazur Sahib Nanded–Sriganganagar Express
 Amravati–Tirupati Biweekly Superfast Express

References

Railway stations in Washim district
Nanded railway division